Mercè Company i González  (Barcelona, 19 May 1947) is a Spanish writer in Spanish, Catalan and French languages.

She studied journalism and worked for several magazines and publishing companies. She has authored more than 170 books and been awarded many times for her works as a Children's literature writer (Premi Ciutat d'Olot, de Contes Infantils,  1982; Premi de la Crítica Serra d'Or,  1983, Barcelona's Golden Medal, 1999)

She collaborated with the production of the books and the Cartoon series of The Triplets (Las tres mellizas in Spanish,  Les tres bessones in Catalan) by the Catalan television producer enterprise Cromosoma.

Main works

Works in Catalan
 Els contes de l'oncle Agust, 1973. (col. of 4 books)
 Anna i Víctor, 1981.
 Kiko, el pollet La Bruixa Bufuruda 1983.
 En Gil i el paraigua màgic, 1982.
 Les peripècies d'en Quico Pelacanyes, 1983.
 Charlot, 1984.
 La casa del catus, 1984.
 La petita fantasma, Col. de 6 tìtols.
 La Nana Bunilda menja malsons, 1985.
 La història de Ernest, 1985.
 El món de les coses perdudes, 1986.
 El senyor dels núvols, 1987.
 A les golfes, 1988.
 La reina calva, 1988.
 El jardí de l'Espai, 1989.
 Bruixes, diables i apareguts, 1989.
 Tips de riure, escrit amb col·laboració, 1989.
 La granja dels artistes, Mercè Aránega, Timun Mas, 1989-1990 (col. of 4 books)
 La Nana Bunilda, 1990.
 La Presència La Dama del Medalló, 2000.
 La VeuWorks in Spanish
 Bamba, el rey gordo, 1982.
 La niña del drap Mmm... qué rica manzana, 1990.

Works in French
 Nous sommes les trois petits soeurs, 1985.
 L'Arbre-mémoire, 1990.
 La Bougie magique, 1990.
 Le Cadeau du Père Noël, 1991.
 Les racines perdues, 1991.
 Les ours dormeurs'', 1992.

External links
 Pàgina respecte a l'escriptora. 

1947 births
Living people
Women writers from Catalonia
Spanish writers in French
Spanish children's writers
Spanish women children's writers